The 1930–31 Panhellenic Championship was the third season of the highest football league of Greece. Olympiacos emerged champion for the 1st time in its history. On the other hand, Apollon Athens, Ethnikos Piraeus and Iraklis qualified for the relegation play-offs for the Athenian, Piraeus' and Macedonian Association, respectively. All three prevailed over their opponents and remained in the national division.

It was held as a national division, in which 8 teams from the 3 founding Associations of the HFF, participated and resulted as follows:
Athenian Championship: The first 3 teams of the ranking.
Piraeus' Championship: The first 2 teams of the ranking.
Macedonian Championship: The first 3 teams of the ranking.

These teams did not participate in the regional championships and their stay in the national division was judged by a play-off round. According to the regulations of the time, whoever finished in a lower position than the other teams of the same Association had to play a two-legged round against the winner of the corresponding regional championship to decide who will qualify for the next season's Panhellenic Championship.

The point system was: Win: 2 points - Draw: 1 point - Loss: 0 points.

Qualification round

Athens Football Clubs Association

It was held in a group in the form of a one-round tournament (6 matches), but the championship was considered to have ended despite the fact that some clubs had not completed their matches.

Piraeus Football Clubs Association

The championship started initially with 4 teams, until Olympiacos and Ethnikos Piraeus left and joined the national division. Then, the championship continued with the 2 remaining teams. In the first 2 matches between them for the championship, the matches ended in a draw with 1–1 and 3–3 respectively. A double final was held at Neo Phaliron Velodrome to decide the champion. In the 1st match of the final held on Sunday, March 29, 1931, Amyna Kokkinia prevailed by 4–1 and in the 2nd match on Sunday, April 5, 1931, won again by 2–1 and officially became champion. The standings until the departure of Olympiacos and Ethnikos Piraeus were as follows:

Macedonia Football Clubs Association

The championship started with the participation of 6 clubs, but was interrupted in December 1930 after the draw of the national division, where Aris, PAOK and Iraklis would participate. The remaining 3 teams, however, continued in a mini championship in which Megas Alexandros prevailed.

Final round

League table

Results

Relegation play-offs

|+

|}

Top scorers

References

External links
Rsssf 1930–31 championship

Panhellenic Championship seasons
Greece
1930–31 in Greek football